Torbjörn Ek (25 June 1949, Ljusdal - 18 August 2010, Ljusdal) was a Swedish bandy and football player and manager. He was considered one of the country's top bandy players during the 1970s and early 1980s.

Ek was capped 102 times for the Swedish national bandy team, scoring 89 goals, and was a member of silver-medal winning teams at the Bandy World Cup on 6 occasions. He was a member of the team which won the junior bandy world cup in 1967. In 1975 Ek's team Ljusdals BK won the Swedish bandy league. He managed the Swedish national bandy team for 1 match, in 1993.

Ek also had an elite football career, playing in 62 Allsvenskan matches, for AIK (1971–1973) and GIF Sundsvall (1975), winning a silver medal as a member of the AIK team which finished as runner-up in the 1972 season.

References

1947 births
2010 deaths
People from Ljusdal Municipality
Swedish bandy players
Swedish footballers
Swedish football managers
AIK Fotboll players
GIF Sundsvall players
Allsvenskan players
Ljusdals BK players
Västerås SK Bandy players
Association footballers not categorized by position
Sportspeople from Gävleborg County